KORR (104.1 FM) is a radio station broadcasting an Adult Top-40 format. Licensed to American Falls, Idaho, United States, the station serves the Pocatello area.  The station is currently owned by Idaho Wireless Corporation.

History
The station was assigned the call letters KOUU on November 29, 1991. On February 17, 1995, the station changed to the current KORR.

References

External links

ORR
Adult top 40 radio stations in the United States